David F. Schmitz (born September 4, 1956) holds the Robert Allen Skotheim Chair of History at Whitman College. He specializes in 20th Century United States history, especially United States Foreign Policy.

He received a PhD, from Rutgers University in 1985, with a thesis "United States foreign policy toward fascist Italy, 1922-1940".

Bibliography 

The United States and Right-wing Dictatorships, 1965-1989, New York: Cambridge University Press, 2006. . According to WorldCat, the book is held in  530 libraries 
Brent Scowcroft: internationalism and post-Vietnam War American foreign policy, Lanham, Md.: Rowman & Littlefield, ©2011. 
The triumph of internationalism: Franklin D. Roosevelt and a world in crisis, 1933-1941, Washington, D.C. : Potomac Books, 2007. 
The Tet Offensive : Politics, war, and public opinion, Lanham: Rowman & Littlefield, 2005.  According to WorldCat, the book is held in  427 libraries  
Henry L. Stimson: the first wise man, Wilmington, Del.: SR Books, 2001. 
 (co-edited with  T. Christopher Jespersen) Architects of the American century: individuals and institutions in twentieth-century U.S. foreign policymaking, Chicago: Imprint, 2000. 
Thank God they're on our side: the United States and Right-wing Dictatorships, 1921-1965, Chapel Hill: University of North Carolina Press, 1999. . According to WorldCat, the book is held in 462 libraries 
 (co-edited, with Richard D. Challener) Appeasement in Europe: a reassessment of U.S. policies, New York: Greenwood Press, 1990. 
The United States and fascist Italy, 1922-1940, Chapel Hill: University of North Carolina Press, 1988.

References 

Place of birth missing (living people)
1956 births
Living people
21st-century American historians
21st-century American male writers
Whitman College faculty
Rutgers University alumni
American male non-fiction writers